The Calcutta Times is a free supplement circulated with the Times of India published by the Times Group in Kolkata (formally Calcutta) region. Daily supplement focuses on city specific issues, in a very lucid manner, which generally appeal to urban youth. This supplement covers page 3 parties, entertainment news and includes regular features like television guide, movies, regular crosswords. A large part of the supplement is dedicated to celebrity gossip from Tollywood, Bollywood and Hollywood. It also covers celebrity news, news features, international and national music news, international and national fashion news, lifestyle and feature articles pegged on news events both national and international that have local interest value.

The Times of India and Calcutta Times together rank top in terms of circulation in Calcutta.

External links
 Calcutta Times – Online supplement

The Times of India
Publications of The Times Group
Publications with year of establishment missing
Mass media in Kolkata